A community is an administrative division found in Belgium, Canada, Georgia, Greece, Iceland, Trinidad and Tobago, Ukraine, Wales, and the League of Nations Class A mandates.

Notable examples
 Community (Armenia)
 Community (China)
 Community (Greece)
 Community (Wales)

See also
Autonomous community
Residential community
Community council

References

Types of administrative division
Types of communities